Kayan (Kajan, Kayan proper) is a dialect cluster spoken by the Kayan people of Borneo. It is a cluster of closely related dialects with limited mutual intelligibility, and is itself part of the Kayan-Murik group of Austronesian languages.

Baram Kayan is a local trade language. Bahau is part of the dialect cluster, but is not ethnically Kayan.

Phonology 
The following is based on the Baram dialect:

Consonants 

  can be heard as either a tap  or a trill  in free variation.
  can be heard as  when in free fluctuation with [k] in word-medial position.
  can be realized as more fronted  when preceding high vocoids.
  may also be heard as a palatalized stop  in free fluctuation.

Vowels 

 Length [Vː] is said to occur in free variation or in word-final position.

External links

Languages of Malaysia
Languages of Indonesia
Kayan–Murik languages